The Bratislava City Gallery (abbr. GMB) is a gallery located in Bratislava, Slovakia, in the Old Town. It is the second largest Slovak gallery of its kind. The gallery is housed at the Mirbach Palace (Mirbachov palác) and Pálffy Palace (Pálffyho palác).

The gallery was founded in 1961, although the first attempts to collect works of arts began in the 19th century, when the Bratislava City Museum was established. It currently contains approximately 35,000 works of art.

References

External links

 Official site 

Culture in Bratislava
Art museums and galleries in Slovakia
Museums in Bratislava
Art museums established in 1961
1961 establishments in Slovakia